Carley may refer to:

Carley (name)
Carley float, a lifeboat design
Carley Hill, in North East England, United Kingdom
Carley State Park, in Minnesota, United States

See also
Carly (disambiguation)
Kali (disambiguation)